Dori Media Group LTD Dori Media Group is an international group of media companies, located in Israel, Switzerland, Argentina, Spain and Singapore. The group produces and distributes TV and New Media content, broadcasts various TV channels and operates video-content internet sites. The group owns approximately 7,500 TV hours, more than 7,500 3 minute clips, 120 - 9 minute webisodes and around 556 1-5 minute cellular episodes. The companies' catalogue contains weekly and daily series, reality and entertainment formats as well as kids programs, which the company sells to a wide variety of audiences in more than 100 countries.

History
Dori Media was founded in 1996 by Yair Dori, who in the early 1990s started importing Argentinean soaps to the Israeli market, which became a huge success and led to the creation of cable channels, which dedicate themselves to air Latin soaps.

In 2000 the production company Darset Productions is established in partnership with Danny Paran, Leora Nir and Dori Media Group.
 
In 2002, Mapal Communications, owned by Tami Mozes and Nadav Palti, signed a partnership with Yair Dori.

In 2003 - Dori Media Group establishes its international center in Zurich, Switzerland (Dori Media International) and establishes a production company in Argentina (Dori Media Contenidos).

In 2003 Dori Media also begins distributing its productions abroad through an external Argentinian distributor.

In 2005 Dori Media Group issues its shares to the public on the AIM stock exchange in London and becomes a public company.
 
In 2006 Dori Media establishes its global distribution company in Switzerland (Dori Media Distribution). At the same time, Dori Media Distribution Argentina is established in Argentina and Dori Media is recruiting a local sales team. 

In 2006 the company also signs a partnership with Moshe Sadan and founds Dori Media Ot, a company for translations and dubbing for TV programs, conversions and other technical works in the media field.

In 2007 Mapal communications purchases all the shares of Yair Dori and becomes the holder of controlling interest in DMG.

In 2007 - Dori Media Group acquires additional percentages in Dori Media Darset and Dori Media Paran and completes its holdings to 100% in 2011.
 
In 2007, after winning the tender for HOT's movie and series channels, in partnership with Claire Elbaz, "Dori Media Spike" is established. In 2008, HOT channel activity begins. In 2019 the company ended its activity.

In 2011 Dori Media decides to exit the London Stock Exchange and delists following the trend that began after the economic crisis in 2008, in 2011 markets around the world continue to weaken and the stock markets fall. 

In 2013 Dori Media starts its EPG activities.

In 2014 Dori Media establishes the first Multi-Channel Network in Israel - MeMeMe Studios. The company is engaged in the production and distribution of digital content for the Internet and initially via YouTube.

In 2013 Sony Pictures Television acquired 50% of DMG's Baby TV operations in Indonesia and in 2014 acquired 50% of the VIVA and VIVA Plus channels and the VIVA Walla online free video-on-demand (FVOD) service in Israel. The activity was transferred to a new company named Dori TLV. Following a successful period Dori Media acquires back SPT's 50% stake in Dori TLV in 2020/2021.

PRODUCTION
Dori Media International is the center of the group’s worldwide activities. Also creates new projects around the world and finds partners for Israeli productions and for global remakes, for our track record and new titles. 

Dori Media Studios and Dori Media Sumayoko Studios produce top-end series, daily dramas as well as feature films for the Israeli and international markets. 

Dori Media Contenidos produces fiction in Argentina for the international market.

TV Channels
Dori Media, through Dori TLV, owns and operates four daily drama channels, Viva, Viva Plus, Viva Vintage and Viva Premium, carried by all Israeli multi-channel platforms. Dori also operates an SVOD service called Viva Before Everyone on the main 2 platforms, as well as an AVOD service, offering daily dramas to Israeli surfers through viva.walla.com.

Dori TLV also provides EPG services for all the multi-channel platforms in Israel and other OTT platforms.
In Indonesia, the company owns and operates a daily drama channel, FMN TV Channel which is carried by the multi-channel platforms MNC Vision.

TECHNICAL SERVICES
Dori Media OT is the group’s technical services arm, offering subtitling, dubbing, video & audio editing and format conversions.

Dori Media Ot is one of the largest of its kind in Israel and enjoys also many international clients such as Fanimation, Netflix, Disney, Sony, broadcasters and production companies.

List of Productions
The following are Television programs, mainly Telenovelas, produced by Dori Media Group (mostly in Argentina).

 Amor Latino (with Central Park Producciones) (2000)
 Rebelde Way (with Cris Morena Group) (2002–2003)
 Fortuna de Amor (with Central Park Producciones) (2002)
 Rincon de Luz (with Cris Morena Group) (2003)
 The Game of Life (2003)
 Padre Coraje (with Pol-ka) (2004)
 Floricienta (with Cris Morena Group and RGB Entertainment) (2004–2005)
 Amor Mio (with Cris Morena Group and RGB Entertainment) (2005)
 Sos Mi Vida (with Pol-ka) (2006)
 Arab Labor for Keshet (2007-2013)
 Collar De Esmeraldas (with Ideas del Sur) (2006)
 El Refugio (2006)
 Juanita la Soltera (with Pol-ka) (2006)
 Lalola (with Underground Contenidos) (2007)
 Mannequins (for HOT) (2007) 
 La Maga y el Camino Dorado (with Nickelodeon and Illusion Studios) (2008)
 Amanda O (2008)
 Ciega a Citas (2009)
 Money Time (for HOT) (2009)
 Champs 12 (2009)
 Cupido - El Negocio del Amor
 Diggers (for HOT) (2010)
 First Love (2010-2011)
 Split (for HOT) (2009-2011)
 Galis (for HOT) (2011-2015)
 Senales del fin del mundo (2014)
 New York (for YES) (2012-2014)
 SYPD (for HOT) (2012-2018)
 Enigma (for YES) (2013)
 Selfies (with HSCC Slutsky Productions for HOT) (2014)
 Power Couple (Abot Hameiri for Channel 10) (2014)
 The Surfers (with Tedy for Noga) (2014-2015)
 Esperanza Mia (with Polka) (2015)
 His Wife (for Channel 10) (2015)
 Mario (for YES) (2015)
 Doctor Libi (for HOT) (2015-2017)
 Fullmoon (with HSCC Slutsky Productions for HOT) (2016)
 Complicated (for Channel 10) (2016)
 Dumb (for HOT) (2016-2019)
 Las Estrellas (with Polka) (2017)
 Vloggers – The Calizo Project (with HSCC Slutsky Productions for HOT) (2018)
 Eilat (for HOT) (2018)
 The Box (with Doron Mor for KidZ) (2018)
 The New Black (for HOT) (2018-2021)
 Run!!! (for HOT) (2019)
 Middle East Central (for HOT) (2019)
 Losing Alice (for HOT) (2019)
 Normal (for HOT) (2019)
 Hammam (with Abot Hameiri for Kan11) (2022)

References

External links
 

Television production companies of Argentina
Companies formerly listed on the London Stock Exchange
Companies based in Tel Aviv
Television production companies of Israel
2005 initial public offerings